Earth Warp is a story produced by the BBC as part of their Look and Read programme. It originally aired on BBC2 from 11 January to 22 March 1994. The story was 10 episodes long and focused heavily on pollution. It has been repeated many times since the original broadcast, as recently as 2009.

Story
One hundred years ago, Aliens sent a probe to Earth. The purpose of this probe was to monitor the pollution levels of the Earth.

One day the probe surfaces and detects a high pollution level and signals the aliens. An alien, named Ollie, comes to investigate the town of Southbeach because of the probe. The town is also suffering from a mysterious illness found in the children, apparently due to pollutants being pumped into the sea by a local factory. The local children befriend Ollie, who informs them that the pollution in Earth's atmosphere is causing things created by his species – like the probe – to malfunction. He also informs them that the malfunctioning probe is going to explode. This would start a chain reaction that would destroy Southbeach.

Characters
Ollie 
A plump little alien from the planet Gia - 'Ollie' is merely an approximate version of his name, as his real name is unpronounceable in English - who comes to earth to investigate after receiving a signal from the probe, (Charlie), sent by his species. He has the ability to turn invisible and shrink. He possesses a mysterious ball which can be used to fix broken and/or damaged objects and cure the illness being caused by the pollutants (although he claims that this feature cannot be used too often). He can also summon his hidden spaceship by whistling. Prolonged exposure to earth's atmosphere makes him uncoordinated and will gradually weaken him.

Martin 
One of the three friends who are amongst the first to encounter Ollie. His mother owns a hotel which is doing badly due to the mysterious illness. He also has asthma, although it is unclear whether Ollie's mysterious ball cures him along with those infected with the mysterious virus. During the series he briefly betrays Ollie to try to save the hotel, although he later pretends to be Ollie to draw the resulting officials away.

Amina 
One of the three friends who are amongst the first to encounter Ollie. She greatly cares for the environment and wishes that all people could be bothered to care as well, she is also headstrong and takes the role as leader of the group. It is revealed that Ollie chose to reveal himself to her because he could sense her caring nature and thought she could help him. To cover for Ollie's increasing hunger and clumsiness, she pretends that she can do magic to account for some of the objects he has knocked over while invisible, which gets the attention of the press. During their investigation into the pollution, she gets sick. This is cured by Ollie using his mysterious ball, which Ollie later gives to her before his departure after she used it to cure him of his weakness.

Jenny 
One of the three friends who are amongst the first to encounter Ollie; she is interested in journalism, spending most of the series making notes of their experiences. She also cares deeply for Martin and persuades Amina and Ollie that he is a good person. Her judgement seems to be misplaced briefly when Martin betrays Ollie to Lowin, but soon after her beliefs are confirmed when Martin draws the authorities away from Ollie.

Mrs. Rowlands 
Martin's mother, manager of The Burlington Hotel where the children conceal Ollie, throughout the series she constantly tries to keep from selling the hotel to Mr. Belcher, almost doing so in one episode. The events of the series bring mass bookings and make the hotel a success again.

Joe Lowin 
A reporter investigating the mysterious illness. He is the one who persuades Martin to betray Ollie. He has a desire to make it big and get a big story for his paper "The Daily News", he dislikes other reporters, which is shown in the way he speaks to Sarah, at the end of the series when the children give their story to Sarah first he quits the reporting business. Although in the educational section of the programme (which takes place a year later), he is referred to by Chris and Sarah as though he's become a member of staff of the Gasset.

Mr. Belcher 
A factory owner dumping dangerous waste into the sea, and attempting to conceal this activity. He repeatedly attempts to buy the hotel from Martin's mother, he nearly succeeds at one point, although he later comes to realise the danger of his actions when his daughter, Clare, becomes sick from the illness.  He is arrested and fined at the end of the series after the authorities find out about his illegal activities, although he redeems himself by helping Ollie reach the probe before it explodes at the last minute.

Sarah Brightly 
A reporter from "The Southbeach Gazette" as well as the narrator of the story and one of the 3 characters in the education section of the episodes, she is Jenny's role model and an Eco Warrior. Throughout the series, she tries to find the cause of the illness, she even takes an interest when Anita starts doing magic.

Chef played by Mark Benton 
One of the staff working at the hotel, He seems to be fond of Mrs. Rowlands and his constant jokes are a source of annoyance to Martin. On a walk near the river he starts whistling, Ollie's ship hears him, and, thinking Ollie is summoning it, rises to find him, seeing that it isn't Ollie it utters a low growling apology and returns to the depths. After the experience the Chef tries to forget about it, but has a hard time, with everything else going on.

Jenny's Dad 
He initially works in Mr. Belcher's factory, but later refuses to continue due to the potential damage the job is causing to the environment and quits when Anita falls ill, even though Belcher claims to have fired him first. At the end of the series, he gets his job back, under a new and eco-friendly boss.

Clare 
Mr. Belcher's daughter, she spends most of the series in her father's car and in silence, when Amina falls ill she rushes to help, ignoring her father's orders to return to the car, but she becomes infected when helping the kids. Seeing her in this state, her father begins to see the error of his ways, but it isn't until she stops him from turning in Ollie that he truly sees what he did wrong, so although not the most important character, she is somewhat the most powerful character.

Z.o.t. 
A language probe, who resides in Sarah's computer, one of the 3 characters in the education section of the episodes, in this series he replaces the character of "Wordy" as the 'animated' educator of the show. His name apparently stands for "Zero in On Target", he can either be summoned by either Sarah or Chris tapping the space bar three times or can summon himself into existence, he has stores of information on language and whenever he accesses one of them he shouts "Zot", beaming the information onto the computer. He introduces many different characters including News Hound, Bill the Brickie, Ellie (Ollie's Sister), Gussy Gunge, Lazer Larry and the Magic E Magician.

Chris 
A work experience student, Sarah expected a girl but she left school and when Chris joined the school he was chosen to replace her, not the brightest of people, he and Zot have their heated moments, but he learns keenly and quickly, he even attempts to copy Zot by summoning Bill The Brickie, but fails. At the end of the series his story makes the front page of the Gasset.

Ellie 
The sister of Ollie. She is shown in the educational section of the show and features in a few songs, one of which is entitled "I'm Ellie the sister of Ollie."

References

1994 British television series debuts
1994 British television series endings
1990s British children's television series
BBC children's television shows
British educational television series
British television shows for schools
Look and Read
English-language television shows
1990s British science fiction television series